That Was Then, This Is Now is the fourth studio album by Josh Wilson. Sparrow Records alongside distributor Capitol Christian Music Group released the album on July 31, 2015.

Critical reception

Awarding the album four stars from CCM Magazine, Rebekah Bell states, "a great all-around album to listen to front to back", where its "a spiritually deep and thought-provoking collection." Amanda Furbeck, giving the album four stars at Worship Leader, says, "That Was Then, This Is Now exudes the excitement, enthusiasm, and charisma of a sinner who is thankful to be saved by grace." Specifying in a four and a half star review from New Release Today, Kevin Davis replies, "This is Wilson's best overall album".

Jonathan Harris, indicating in an eight out of ten review by Cross Rhythms, responds, "There's no shortage of originality with the lyrical content, which are often punchy, clever and had this reviewer reaching for his notebook more often than not." Giving the album three and a half stars at Jesus Freak Hideout, David Craft describes, "The diversity of That Was Then, This Is Now is somewhat less defined than some of his previous works". Bert Gangl, indicating in a three and a half star review from Jesus Freak Hideout, states, "Wilson is an undeniable vocal and instrumental talent and his new album has much to recommend it to both newcomers and the already-converted alike."

Lauren McLean, rating the album a 3.9 out of five for Christian Music Review, writes, "this album is a good one", where "There isn't a bad song on here." Signaling in a four star review by CM Addict, Michael Tackett says, "'That Was Then, This Is Now' is an ambitious, fun pop record that stretches John Wilson musically and lyrically." Jonathan Andre, awarding the album five stars for 365 Days of Inspiring Media, states, "Josh has delivered a standout album". Rating the album three stars at The Christian Manifesto, Calvin Moore writes, "[on] That Was Then, This Is Now, he shows no signs of slowing down."

Track listing

Charts

References

2015 albums
Sparrow Records albums
Josh Wilson (musician) albums